Richard Edwin Ekins, KC (Hon) is a New Zealand legal academic working in the United Kingdom. He is Professor of Law and Constitutional Government in the University of Oxford, a fellow of St John's College, Oxford, and the head of Policy Exchange's Judicial Power Project.

Ekins was educated at the University of Auckland, where he obtained his BA, LLB (Hons) and BA (Hons), and the University of Oxford, where he graduated BCL, MPhil and DPhil. He was previously a judge's clerk at the High Court of New Zealand at Auckland, a lecturer at Balliol College, Oxford, and a senior lecturer in Law at the University of Auckland.

Ekins was created an honorary King's Counsel in 2022.

References 

Scholars of constitutional law
Fellows of St John's College, Oxford
New Zealand legal scholars
University of Auckland alumni
Alumni of the University of Oxford
Academic staff of the University of Auckland
Year of birth missing (living people)
Living people
Honorary King's Counsel
English King's Counsel
21st-century King's Counsel
Legal scholars of the University of Oxford